A lasso is a loop of rope that is designed to be thrown around a target and tighten when pulled.

Lasso may also refer to:

 Lasso (programming language), an internet programming language
 Lasso (statistics), a technique for L1-norm regularization
 Lasso (video sharing app), a short video sharing app by Facebook
 Lasso, Burkina Faso
 Lasso of Truth, a fictional weapon wielded by comic book superheroine Wonder Woman
 "Lasso," a song from Phoenix's 2009 album Wolfgang Amadeus Phoenix
 Lasallian Schools Supervision Office, De La Salle Supervised Schools
 Lasso tool, in image editing software
 Lasso, tradename for the herbicide Alachlor

People and fictional characters
 Lasso (singer) (born 1988), Venezuelan singer
 Galo Plaza Lasso (1906–1987), president of Ecuador from 1948 to 1952
 Giulio Lasso (died 1617), Italian architect
 Guillermo Lasso (born 1955), Ecuadorian businessman and politician
 Luchist Lasso and Marco Lasso, characters from the manga series Shaman King
 Orlando di Lasso (1532–1594), composer of late Renaissance music
 Ted Lasso, a character from the American television series of the same name